(October 15, 1894 – November 30, 1972) was a diplomat and international authority on social and labor issues.

Career
In 1911 he went to Hawaii as a recipient of the Friend Peace Scholarship. He graduated from Haverford College in 1917, and then attended Columbia University, from which he graduated in 1920. He served as the Japanese delegate to the International Labour Organization in Geneva, Switzerland, and as Director of the Tokyo branch of the ILO until 1939. He joined the staff of the International Christian University in 1952. In 1956, he received an honorary degree from Haverford College. He published several books and articles, including A History of Labor in Modern Japan in 1966. His papers are held by the library of Haverford College.

Faith
Iwao Ayusawa was also a notable member of the small Japanese Quaker community, mainly represented by the Friends Center Committee which was formed some years before the war began to represent Friends to those of various countries who came to Japan with an interest in Quakerism, and to serve the Jewish refugees who were coming in large numbers to Japan at that time. He was befriended with Swiss Quakers Pierre Cérésole and Edmond Privat.

Family
On October 14, 1922, Ayusawa married Tomiko Yoshioka. They had several children, including a daughter Tsuyuko (born, Geneva 30 June 1923), who married Léopold d'Avout, the 5th duc d'Auerstaedt, and became the mother of the 6th French duc d'Auerstadt.

Publications
 International labor legislation, New York, 1920
 Industrial conditions and labour legislation in Japan, Geneva : International Labour Office, 1926
 A History of Labor in Modern Japan, Honolulu, East-West Center Press, 1966
 International Labor Legislation. Clark, N.J.: Lawbook Exchange, 2005. .

References

Japanese diplomats
Japanese Quakers
1894 births
1972 deaths
Haverford College alumni
Columbia University alumni